Kanika (sanskrit, कनिका) is a Sanskrit Indian feminine name, often found in the Hindu and Jain communities. It means "atom", "seed" or "gold". It also means something that is similar to the colour of a wheat grain, essentially golden.

Etymology 
The word Kanika has multiple origins. It may mean one of the following:
 Atom, when derived from Kana(), Sanskrit word for atom.
 Seed, when derived from Kanaka(), Hindi word for seed of wheat.
 Gold, when derived from Kanaka(), Sanskrit word for gold.

Religious significance 
The word is mostly found in Hindu religion. It is also found in Buddhism and Jainism. The zodiac sign usually associated with Kanika is Gemini.

Notable people named Kanika 
 Kanika Banerjee, (born 1924 – died 2000), Indian Rabindra Sangeet musician and singer.
 Kanika Beckles, (born 1991), Grenadian sprinter 
 Kanika Dhillon, Indian novelist and screenplay writer
 Kanika Kapoor, (born 1978), Indian actress and playback singer
 Kanika Maheshwari, (born 1981), Indian television actress
 Kanika Shivpuri, Indian television and film actress
 Kanika Subramaniam or Kaniha or Divya Venkatasubramaniam (born 1982), Indian film actress

References 

Indian feminine given names
Hindu given names